The 26th Annual GMA Dove Awards were held on April 27, 1995, to recognizing accomplishments of musicians for the year 1994. The show was held at the Grand Ole Opry House in Nashville, Tennessee, and was hosted by Gary Chapman, Steven Curtis Chapman, Twila Paris and CeCe Winans.

Award recipients

Artists
Artist of the Year
Steven Curtis Chapman
New Artist of the Year
Clay Crosse
Group of the Year
4Him
Male Vocalist of the Year
Steven Curtis Chapman
Female Vocalist of the Year
Twila Paris
Songwriter of the Year
Steven Curtis Chapman
Producer of the Year
Charlie Peacock

Songs
Song of the Year
“God Is In Control”; Twila Paris
Rap/Hip Hop Recorded Song of the Year
"Luv Is a Verb"; Free at Last; dc Talk
Rock Recorded Song of the Year
"Shine"; Going Public; Newsboys
Pop/Contemporary Recorded Song of the Year
“Heaven in the Real World”; Heaven in the Real World; Steven Curtis Chapman
Hard Music Recorded Song of the Year
“Come Unto the Light”; Unveiled; Whitecross
Southern Gospel Recorded Song of the Year
"I Bowed On My Knees"; The Gaither Vocal Band
Inspirational Recorded Song of the Year
"I Pledge Allegiance to the Lamb"; Allegiance; Ray Boltz
Country Recorded Song of the Year
"Love Will"; Michael James
Traditional Gospel Recorded Song of the Year
"He's Working It Out for You"; Shirley Caesar
Contemporary Gospel Recorded Song of the Year
"God Knows"; Angelo & Veronica

Albums
Rock Album of the Year
Going Public; Newsboys
Pop/Contemporary Album of the Year
Heaven in the Real World; Steven Curtis Chapman
Hard Music Album of the Year
Scarecrow Messiah; Bride
Inspirational Album of the Year
Find It on the Wings; Sandi Patty
Contemporary Gospel Album of the Year
Join the Band; Take 6
Traditional Gospel Album of the Year
Live at GMWA; Shirley Caesar, O'Landa Draper & The Associates, Rev. Milton Brunson & The Thompson Community Singers
Country Album of the Year
The Door; Charlie Daniels
Southern Gospel Album of the Year
High and Lifted Up; The Cathedrals
Instrumental Album of the Year
Strike Up The Band; Ralph Carmichael Big Band
Praise & Worship Album of the Year
Coram Deo II; Out of the Grey, Steve Green, Margaret Becker, Charlie Peacock, Steven Curtis Chapman, CeCe Winans, and Bob Carlisle
Children's Music Album of the Year
Yo! Kidz! 2: The Armor of God; Carman
Musical Album
Living on the Edge; Michael W. Smith
Choral Collection Album
A Christmas Suite; David T. Clydesdale
Recorded Music Packaging of the Year
Heaven in the Real World; Karen Philpott, Gerhart Yurkovic, E.J. Carr, R.J. Lyons

Videos
Long Form Music Video of the Year
Mouth in Motion; Mark Lowry
Short Form Music Video of the Year
"I Will Be Free"; Cindy Morgan

References

External links
Dove Awards at MetroLyrics

GMA Music Awards
GMA Dove Awards
1995 in American music
1995 in Tennessee
GMA